Electronic disk may refer to:

 Solid-state drive, a data storage device functionally similar to a hard disk drive but using flash memory
 Capacitance Electronic Disc, an obsolete consumer video playback format developed by RCA
 Television Electronic Disc, a discontinued video recording format